Hernandia bivalvis, known variously as the grease nut and cudgerie, is a species of plant in the family Hernandiaceae. It is endemic to Queensland in Australia.

References

Hernandiaceae
Flora of Queensland
Ornamental plants